Mirbelia rubiifolia, commonly known as heathy mirbelia, is a species of flowering plant in the family Fabaceae and is endemic to eastern Australia. It is a diffuse, spreading shrub with narrowly egg-shaped to linear, sharply-pointed leaves and clusters of pink to purple flowers.

Description
The upper surface has a conspicuous network of veins and the lower surface sometimes has a few scattered hairs.

Taxonomy
Heathy mirbelia was first formally described in 1804 by Henry Cranke Andrews who gave it the name Pultenaea rubiaefolia in The Botanist's Repository for New, and Rare Plants, from material that had been taken to England and cultivated by Lee and Kennedy in Hammersmith in 1792. James Edward Smith changed the name to Mirbelia reticulata in 1805, noting that "[t]he leaves are elegantly reticulated with transverse veins, as if stitched with thread" but the name is illegitimate. In 1832, George Don changed the name to Mirbelia rubiifolia in A General History of Dichlamydeous Plants.
The specific epithet (rubiifolia) refers to the resemblance of its leaves to those of the genus Rubus.

Distribution and habitat
Heathy mirbelia is found in sclerophyll forest and woodlands, as well as in heath on sandy soils on the coast or tablelands, often in areas liable to inundation. It is found from Croajingolong National Park in Victoria northward through New South Wales to Queensland.

Use in horticulture
Mirbelia rubiifolia is rarely cultivated, but adapts well to a part-shaded spot in a subtropical garden. Supplementary water in dry spells is beneficial. It can be an untidy and scrambling shrub which can look better with pruning.

References

Mirbelioids
rubiifolia
Fabales of Australia
Flora of New South Wales
Flora of Queensland
Flora of Victoria (Australia)
Plants described in 1804
Taxa named by Henry Cranke Andrews